Katherine Kamhi  (born February 15, 1964) is an American actress, best known for her role as Meg in the slasher film Sleepaway Camp, and as Pamela Kingsley on All My Children.

Early life
When she was 11 years old, she performed as a ballet dancer at Metropolitan Opera House. 
She later did stage acting while at New York's Performing Arts High School, and graduated from Professional Children's School.

Film & television career
Kamhi landed her first screen role as Pamela Kingsley on the popular daytime soap opera All My Children in 1980. She continued to appear on the series until 1982.

In 1983, Kamhi made her film debut in the horror film Sleepaway Camp, playing the role of mean-spirited camp counselor Meg. Since its release, the film has achieved status as a cult classic from what is often considered the golden age of slasher cinema.

Following Sleepaway Camp, Kamhi went on to appear as Marcy Campbell on Guiding Light for four years.

Since the 2000s, Kamhi has consistently landed guest starring roles in many other popular TV shows. Some of her most notable appearances have been in series like Judging Amy, Ghost Whisperer, Bones, Castle, Scorpion, and NCIS: Los Angeles, as well as on soap operas such as General Hospital and The Young and the Restless.

She is currently filming for a documentary on Sleepaway Camp called Angela: The Official Sleepaway Camp Documentary, directed by Michael Perez.

Personal life
She currently lives in Los Angeles with her husband Tony Coghlan; they have one daughter, Madeleine, and one son, Jack.

Filmography

 All My Children (1980-1982) as Pamela Kingsley
 CBS Afternoon Playhouse (1981) as Becky
 The Edge of Night (1982) as Girl in restaurant
 Sleepaway Camp (1983) as Meg
 Kate & Allie (1984) as Suzie
 Silent Madness (1984) as Jane
 American Playhouse (1985) as Josephine Cosnowski
 ABC Afterschool Special (1988) as Julia Flemming
 Guiding Light (Late 1980s) as an unknown role
 The Marshall Chronicles (1990) as Leslie's Sister
 Get a Life (1990) as Stacy
 NYPD Blue (1995) as Connie Williams
 L.A. Dragnet (2003) as Det. Hubbel
 The Practice (2003) as Atty. Marsha Singleton
 Judging Amy (2003) as Ella Croft and Mrs. Nichols
 Without a Trace (2003) as Paula
 Ghost Whisperer (2008) as Deb Yates
 Mental (2009) as Elodie Martin
 The Young and the Restless (2008–2009) as Dr. Alicia Jamison, and Gretchen Mills
 Bones (2009) as Officer Lisa Kopek
 Medium (2010) as Whitten Mom
 Law & Order: LA (2011) as Det. Anna Lundgrad
 Touch as Sharon DeLuca
 Castle (2013) as Lina El-Masri
 The Occupants (2014) as Mother
 Parenthood (2014) as Dr. Meadow
 Scorpion (2015) as Dr. Hill
 NCIS: Los Angeles (2016) as Samantha Rogers
 Code Black (2016) as Denise
 Girl Followed (2017) as Nice Woman in the Park
 Get Shorty (2017-2018) as Cath Nardini
 Speechless (2017) as Administrator #1
 The Fosters (2018) as Judge Engleman
 Truth Be Told (2019) as Darla
 Oh, Sorry (2020) as Club Patron

References 

1964 births
American television actresses
Living people
Actresses from New York City
21st-century American women